R. W. George Mill, also known as Bob George's Mill and Spencer Mill, is historic corn mill located near Francisco, Stokes County, North Carolina. It was built in 1881, and is a two-story, rectangular, frame building sheathed in weatherboard.  It has a gable roof and three frame additions dating from the mid-1940s. Also on the property is the contributing concrete mill dam.  During World War II, it was converted from a corn mill to a small textile mill, known as Spencer Mills, that produced parachute fabric for the federal government.

It was added to the National Register of Historic Places in 1997.

References

Grinding mills in North Carolina
Grinding mills on the National Register of Historic Places in North Carolina
Industrial buildings completed in 1881
Buildings and structures in Stokes County, North Carolina
National Register of Historic Places in Stokes County, North Carolina
1881 establishments in North Carolina